Music psychology, or the psychology of music, may be regarded as a branch of both psychology and musicology. It aims to explain and understand musical behaviour and experience, including the processes through which music is perceived, created, responded to, and incorporated into everyday life. Modern music psychology is primarily empirical; its knowledge tends to advance on the basis of interpretations of data collected by systematic observation of and interaction with human participants. Music psychology is a field of research with practical relevance for many areas, including music performance, composition, education, criticism, and therapy, as well as investigations of human attitude, skill, performance, intelligence, creativity, and social behavior.

Music psychology can shed light on non-psychological aspects of musicology and musical practice. For example, it contributes to music theory through investigations of the perception and computational modelling of musical structures such as melody, harmony, tonality, rhythm, meter, and form. Research in music history can benefit from systematic study of the history of musical syntax, or from psychological analyses of composers and compositions in relation to perceptual, affective, and social responses to their music.

History

Early history (pre-1850)

The study of sound and musical phenomena prior to the 19th century was focused primarily on the mathematical modelling of pitch and tone. The earliest recorded experiments date from the 6th century BCE, most notably in the work of Pythagoras and his establishment of the simple string length ratios that formed the consonances of the octave.  This view that sound and music could be understood from a purely physical standpoint was echoed by such theorists as Anaxagoras and Boethius. An important early dissenter was Aristoxenus, who foreshadowed modern music psychology in his view that music could only be understood through human perception and its relation to human memory. Despite his views, the majority of musical education through the Middle Ages and Renaissance remained rooted in the Pythagorean tradition, particularly through the quadrivium of astronomy, geometry, arithmetic, and music.

Research by Vincenzo Galilei (father of Galileo) demonstrated that, when string length was held constant, varying its tension, thickness, or composition could alter perceived pitch. From this, he argued that simple ratios were not enough to account for musical phenomenon and that a perceptual approach was necessary. He also claimed that the differences between various tuning systems were not perceivable, thus the disputes were unnecessary. 
Study of topics including vibration, consonance, the harmonic series, and resonance were furthered through the scientific revolution, including work by Galileo, Kepler, Mersenne, and Descartes. This included further speculation concerning the nature of the sense organs and higher-order processes, particularly by Savart, Helmholtz, and Koenig.

Rise of empirical study (1860–1960)

The latter 19th century saw the development of modern music psychology alongside the emergence of a general empirical psychology, one which passed through similar stages of development. The first was structuralist psychology, led by Wilhelm Wundt, which sought to break down experience into its smallest definable parts. This expanded upon previous centuries of acoustic study, and included Helmholtz developing the resonator to isolate and understand pure and complex tones and their perception, the philosopher Carl Stumpf using church organs and his own musical experience to explore timbre and absolute pitch, and Wundt himself associating the experience of rhythm with kinesthetic tension and relaxation.

As structuralism gave way to Gestalt psychology and behaviorism at the turn of the century, music psychology moved beyond the study of isolated tones and elements to the perception of their inter-relationships and human reactions to them, though work languished behind that of visual perception.  In Europe Géza Révész and Albert Wellek developed a more complex understanding of musical pitch, and in the US the focus shifted to that of music education and the training and development of musical skill. Carl Seashore led this work, producing his The Measurement of Musical Talents and The Psychology of Musical Talent. Seashore used bespoke equipment and standardized tests to measure how performance deviated from indicated markings and how musical aptitude differed between students.

In 1963 F. Chrysler was the first one to use the term "science of music" when he was working on his "year book for musical" knowledge. European musicology was found in Greek. They were focused on the philosophy, and the concepts of any relations with music. Greek's several theories rose later to Arab and the Christians theories. Although their theories survived, they were also corrupted along the way, in the Middle Ages of Europe.

Modern (1960–present)

Music psychology in the second half of the 20th century has expanded to cover a wide array of theoretical and applied areas. From the 1960s the field grew along with cognitive science, including such research areas as music perception (particularly of pitch, rhythm, harmony, and melody), musical development and aptitude, music performance, and affective responses to music.

This period has also seen the founding of music psychology-specific journals, societies, conferences, research groups, centers, and degrees, a trend that has brought research toward specific applications for music education, performance, and therapy. While the techniques of cognitive psychology allowed for more objective examinations of musical behavior and experience, the theoretical and technological advancements of neuroscience have greatly shaped the direction of music psychology into the 21st century.

While the majority of music psychology research has focused on music in a Western context, the field has expanded along with ethnomusicology to examine how the perception and practice of music differs between cultures. It has also emerged into the public sphere. In recent years several bestselling popular science books have helped bring the field into public discussion, notably Daniel Levitin's This Is Your Brain On Music (2006) and The World in Six Songs (2008), Oliver Sacks' Musicophilia (2007), and Gary Marcus' Guitar Zero (2012). In addition, the controversial "Mozart effect" sparked lengthy debate among researchers, educators, politicians, and the public regarding the relationship between classical music listening, education, and intelligence.

Research areas

Perception and cognition

Much work within music psychology seeks to understand the cognitive processes that support musical behaviors, including perception, comprehension, memory, attention, and performance. Originally arising in fields of psychoacoustics and sensation, cognitive theories of how people understand music more recently encompass neuroscience, cognitive science, music theory, music therapy, computer science, psychology, philosophy, and linguistics.

Affective response

Music has been shown to consistently elicit emotional responses in its listeners, and this relationship between human affect and music has been studied in depth. This includes isolating which specific features of a musical work or performance convey or elicit certain reactions, the nature of the reactions themselves, and how characteristics of the listener may determine which emotions are felt. The field draws upon and has significant implications for such areas as philosophy, musicology, and aesthetics, as well the acts of musical composition and performance. The implications for casual listeners are also great; research has shown that the pleasurable feelings associated with emotional music are the result of dopamine release in the striatum—the same anatomical areas that underpin the anticipatory and rewarding aspects of drug addiction.
According to research, listening to music has been found to affect the mood of an individual. The main factors in whether it will affect that individual positively or negatively are based on the musics tempo and style. In addition, listening to music also increases cognitive functions, creativity, and decreases feelings of fatigue. All of these factors lead to better workflow and a more optimal result in the activity done while listening to music. This leads to the conclusion that listening to music while performing an activity is an excellent way of increasing productivity and the overall experience. It has been proposed that the ability to understand the emotional meaning of music might rely on the existence of a common neural system for processing the affective meaning of voices/vocalizations and musical sounds. In addition to emotional responses, music has influenced the lifestyles of individuals and changed people's perceptions of what "sexy" is. Although music cannot resolve all human beings needs but is heavily relied on to alter the feelings and emotions.

Neuropsychology

A significant amount of research concerns brain-based mechanisms involved in the cognitive processes underlying music perception and performance. These behaviours include music listening, performing, composing, reading, writing, and ancillary activities. It also is increasingly concerned with the brain basis for musical aesthetics and musical emotion. Scientists working in this field may have training in cognitive neuroscience, neurology, neuroanatomy, psychology, music theory, computer science, and other allied fields, and use such techniques as functional magnetic resonance imaging (fMRI), transcranial magnetic stimulation (TMS), magnetoencephalography (MEG), electroencephalography (EEG), and positron emission tomography (PET).

The cognitive process of performing music requires the interaction of neural mechanisms in both motor and auditory systems.  Since every action expressed in a performance produces a sound that influences subsequent expression, this leads to impressive sensorimotor interplay.

Processing pitch

Perceived pitch typically depends on the fundamental frequency, though the dependence could be mediated solely by the presence of harmonics corresponding to that fundamental frequency. The perception of a pitch without the corresponding fundamental frequency in the physical stimulus is called the pitch of the missing fundamental. Neurons lateral to A1 in marmoset monkeys were found to be sensitive specifically to the fundamental frequency of a complex tone, suggesting that pitch constancy may be enabled by such a neural mechanism.

Pitch constancy refers to the ability to perceive pitch identity across changes in acoustical properties, such as loudness, temporal envelope, or timbre. The importance of cortical regions lateral to A1 for pitch coding is also supported by studies of human cortical lesions and functional magnetic resonance imaging (fMRI) of the brain. These data suggest a hierarchical system for pitch processing, with more abstract properties of sound stimulus processed further along the processing pathways.

Absolute pitch

Absolute pitch (AP) is the ability to identify the pitch of a musical tone or to produce a musical tone at a given pitch without the use of an external reference pitch.  Researchers estimate the occurrence of AP to be 1 in 10,000 people. The extent to which this ability is innate or learned is debated, with evidence for both a genetic basis and for a "critical period" in which the ability can be learned, especially in conjunction with early musical training.

Processing rhythm

Behavioural studies demonstrate that rhythm and pitch can be perceived separately, but that they also interact in creating a musical perception. Studies of auditory rhythm discrimination and reproduction in patients with brain injury have linked these functions to the auditory regions of the temporal lobe, but have shown no consistent localization or lateralization. Neuropsychological and neuroimaging studies have shown that the motor regions of the brain contribute to both perception and production of rhythms.

Even in studies where subjects only listen to rhythms, the basal ganglia, cerebellum, dorsal premotor cortex (dPMC) and supplementary motor area (SMA) are often implicated. The analysis of rhythm may depend on interactions between the auditory and motor systems.

Neural correlates of musical training
Although auditory–motor interactions can be observed in people without formal musical training, musicians are an excellent population to study because of their long-established and rich associations between auditory and motor systems. Musicians have been shown to have anatomical adaptations that correlate with their training. Some neuroimaging studies have observed that musicians show lower levels of activity in motor regions than non-musicians during the performance of simple motor tasks, which may suggest a more efficient pattern of neural recruitment. Other studies have shown that early musical training may positively affect word reading, by  promoting the specialization of an extra right-sided "note visual area" to process spatially relevant visual information (i.e., pentagram,  bars, etc.)  This neuroplastic effect might help prevent surface dyslexia. Music learning also involves the formation of novel audio visuomotor associations, which results in the ability to detect an incorrect association between sounds and the corresponding musical gestures, also allowing to learn how to play a musical instrument.

Motor imagery
Previous neuroimaging studies have consistently reported activity in the SMA and premotor areas, as well as in auditory cortices, when non-musicians imagine hearing musical excerpts. 
Recruitment of the SMA and premotor areas is also reported when musicians are asked to imagine performing.

Psychoacoustics

Psychoacoustics is the scientific study of sound perception. More specifically, it is the branch of science studying the psychological and physiological responses associated with sound (including speech and music). Topics of study include perception of the pitch, timbre, loudness and duration of musical sounds and the relevance of such studies for music cognition or the perceived structure of music; and auditory illusions and how humans localize sound, which can have relevance for musical composition and the design of venues for music performance. Psychoacoustics is a branch of psychophysics.

Cognitive musicology

Cognitive musicology is a branch of cognitive science concerned with computationally modeling musical knowledge with the goal of understanding both music and cognition.

Cognitive musicology can be differentiated from the fields of music cognition and cognitive neuroscience of music by a difference in methodological emphasis. Cognitive musicology uses computer modeling to study music-related knowledge representation and has roots in artificial intelligence and cognitive science. The use of computer models provides an exacting, interactive medium in which to formulate and test theories.

This interdisciplinary field investigates topics such as the parallels between language and music in the brain. Biologically inspired models of computation are often included in research, such as neural networks and evolutionary programs. This field seeks to model how musical knowledge is represented, stored, perceived, performed, and generated. By using a well-structured computer environment, the systematic structures of these cognitive phenomena can be investigated.

Evolutionary musicology

Evolutionary musicology concerns the "origin of music, the question of animal song, selection pressures underlying music evolution", and "music evolution and human evolution". It seeks to understand music perception and activity in the context of evolutionary theory. Charles Darwin speculated that music may have held an adaptive advantage and functioned as a protolanguage, a view which has spawned several competing theories of music evolution. An alternate view sees music as a by-product of linguistic evolution; a type of "auditory cheesecake" that pleases the senses without providing any adaptive function. This view has been directly countered by numerous music researchers.

Cultural differences

An individual's culture or ethnicity plays a role in their music cognition, including their preferences, emotional reaction, and musical memory. Musical preferences are biased toward culturally familiar musical traditions beginning in infancy, and adults' classification of the emotion of a musical piece depends on both culturally specific and universal structural features. Additionally, individuals' musical memory abilities are greater for culturally familiar music than for culturally unfamiliar music.

Applied research areas

Many areas of music psychology research focus on the application of music in everyday life as well as the practices and experiences of the amateur and professional musician. Each topic may utilize knowledge and techniques derived from one or more of the areas described above. Such areas include:

Music in society
Including:
everyday music listening
musical rituals and gatherings (e.g. religious, festive, sporting, political, etc.) 
the role of music in forming personal and group identities 
the relation between music and dancing
social influences on musical preference (peers, family, experts, social background, etc.)

Musical preference

Consumers' choices in music have been studied as they relate to the Big Five personality traits: openness to experience, agreeableness, extraversion, neuroticism, and conscientiousness. In general, the plasticity traits (openness to experience and extraversion) affect music preference more than the stability traits (agreeableness, neuroticism, and conscientiousness). Gender has been shown to influence preference, with men choosing music for primarily cognitive reasons and women for emotional reasons. Relationships with music preference have also been found with mood and nostalgic association.

Background music

The study of background music focuses on the impact of music with non-musical tasks, including changes in behavior in the presence of different types, settings, or styles of music. In laboratory settings, music can affect performance on cognitive tasks (memory, attention, and comprehension), both positively and negatively. Used extensively as an advertising aid, music may also affect marketing strategies, ad comprehension, and consumer choices. Background music can influence learning, working memory and recall, performance while working on tests, and attention in cognitive monitoring tasks. Background music can also be used as a way to relieve boredom, create positive moods, and maintain a private space. Background music has been shown to put a restless mind at ease by presenting the listener with various melodies and tones. It has been shown that listening to different types of music may modulate differently psychological mood and physiological responses associated with the induced emotions. For example, listening to atonal music might result in reduced heart rate (fear bradycardia) and increased blood pressure (both diastolic and systolic), possibly reflecting an increase in alertness and attention, psychological tension, and anxiety.

Music in marketing

In both radio and television advertisements, music plays an integral role in content recall, intentions to buy the product, and attitudes toward the advertisement and brand itself. Music's effect on marketing has been studied in radio ads, TV ads, and physical retail settings.

One of the most important aspects of an advertisement's music is the "musical fit", or the degree of congruity between cues in the ad and song content. Advertisements and music can be congruous or incongruous for both lyrical and instrumental music. The timbre, tempo, lyrics, genre, mood, as well as any positive or negative associations elicited by certain music should fit the nature of the advertisement and product.

Music and productivity 

Several studies have recognized that listening to music while working affects the productivity of people performing complex cognitive tasks. One study suggested that listening to one's preferred genre of music can enhance productivity in the workplace, though other research has found that listening to music while working can be a source of distraction, with loudness and lyrical content possibly playing a role. Other factors proposed to affect the relationship between music listening and productivity include musical structure, task complexity, and degree of control over the choice and use of music.

Music education

Including:
optimizing music education
development of musical behaviors and abilities throughout the lifespan 
the specific skills and processes involved in learning a musical instrument or singing
activities and practices within a music school
individual versus group learning of a musical instrument
the effects of musical education on intelligence 
optimizing practice

Musical aptitude

Musical aptitude refers to a person's innate ability to acquire skills and knowledge required for musical activity, and may influence the speed at which learning can take place and the level that may be achieved. Study in this area focuses on whether aptitude can be broken into subsets or represented as a single construct, whether aptitude can be measured prior to significant achievement, whether high aptitude can predict achievement, to what extent aptitude is inherited, and what implications questions of aptitude have on educational principles.

It is an issue closely related to that of intelligence and IQ, and was pioneered by the work of Carl Seashore. While early tests of aptitude, such as Seashore's The Measurement of Musical Talent, sought to measure innate musical talent through discrimination tests of pitch, interval, rhythm, consonance, memory, etc., later research found these approaches to have little predictive power and to be influenced greatly by the test-taker's mood, motivation, confidence, fatigue, and boredom when taking the test.

Music performance

Including:
the physiology of performance 
music reading and sight-reading, including eye movement
performing from memory and music-related memory
acts of improvisation and composition
flow experiences
the interpersonal/social aspects of group performance
music performance quality evaluation by an audience or evaluator(s) (e.g. audition or competition), including the influence of musical and non-musical factors
audio engineering

Music and health

Health benefits 
Scientific studies suggest that singing can have positive effects on people's health.  A preliminary study based on self-reported data from a survey of students participating in choral singing found perceived benefits including increased lung capacity, improved mood, stress reduction, as well as perceived social and spiritual benefits. However, one much older study of lung capacity compared those with professional vocal training to those without, and failed to back up the claims of increased lung capacity. Singing may positively influence the immune system through the reduction of stress.  One study found that both singing and listening to choral music reduces the level of stress hormones and increases immune function.

A multinational collaboration to study the connection between singing and health was established in 2009, called Advancing Interdisciplinary Research in Singing (AIRS). Singing provides physical, cognitive, and emotional benefits to participants. When they step on stage, many singers forget their worries and focus solely on the song. Singing is becoming a more widely known method of increasing an individual's overall health and wellness, in turn helping them to battle diseases such as cancer more effectively due to decreased stress, releasing of endorphins, and increased lung capacity.

Effect on the brain 
John Daniel Scott, among others, have cited that "people who sing are more likely to be happy". This is because "singing elevates the levels of neurotransmitters which are associated with pleasure and well being". Humans have a long prehistory of music, especially singing; before written language, stories were passed down through song, because song is often more memorable. There is also evidence that music or singing may have evolved in humans before language. Levitin, in his This is Your Brain on Music, argues that "music may be the activity that prepared our pre-human ancestors for speech communication" and that "singing ... might have helped our species to refine motor skills, paving the way for the development of the exquisitely fine muscle control required for vocal ... speech" (260). On the other hand, he cites Pinker, who "argued that language is an adaptation and music is its Spandrel ... an evolutionary accident piggybacking on language" (248).

Studies have found evidence suggesting the mental, as well as physical, benefits of singing. When conducting a study with 21 members of a choir at three different points over one year, three themes suggested three areas of benefits; the social impact (connectedness with others), personal impact (positive emotions, self-perception, etc.), and functional outcomes (health benefits of being in the choir). Findings showed that a sense of well-being is associated with singing, by uplifting the mood of the participants and releasing endorphins in the brain. Many singers also reported that singing helped them regulate stress and relax, allowing them to deal better with their daily lives. From a social perspective, approval from the audience, and interaction with other choir members in a positive manner is also beneficial.

Singing is beneficial for pregnant mothers. By giving them another medium of communication with their newborns, mothers in one study reported feelings of love and affection when singing to their unborn children. They also reported feeling more relaxed than ever before during their stressful pregnancy. A song can have nostalgic significance by reminding a singer of the past, and momentarily transport them, allowing them to focus on singing and embrace the activity as an escape from their daily lives and problems.

Effect on body 
A recent study by Tenovus Cancer Care found that singing in a choir for just one hour boosts levels of immune proteins in cancer patients and has a positive overall effect on the health of patients. The study explores the possibility that singing could help put patients in the best mental and physical shape to receive the treatment they need, by reducing stress hormones, and increasing quantities of cytokines—proteins of the immune system that can increase the body's ability to fight disease. "Singing gives you physical benefits like breath control and muscle movement and enunciation, as well as the learning benefits of processing information" says a musical director and accompanist in the study. The enunciation and speech benefits tie into the language benefits detailed below.

Some have advocated, as in a 2011 article in the Toronto Star, that everyone sing, even if they are not musically talented, because of its health benefits. Singing lowers blood pressure by releasing pent up emotions, boosting relaxation, and reminding them of happy times. It also allows singers to breathe more easily. Patients with lung disease and chronic pulmonary disease experience relief from their symptoms from singing just two times a week. In addition to breathing related illness, singing also has numerous benefits for stroke victims when it comes to relearning the ability to speak and communicate by singing their thoughts. Singing activates the right side of the brain when the left side cannot function (the left side is the area of the brain responsible for speech), so it is easy to see how singing can be an excellent alternative to speech while the victim heals.

Physical benefits 
1. Works the lungs, tones up the intercostals and diaphragm.

2. Improves sleep

3. Benefits cardio function by improving aerobic capacity

4. Relaxes overall muscle tension

5. Improves posture.

6. Opens up sinuses and respiratory tubes

7. With training, it could help decrease snoring

8. Releases endorphins

9. Boosts immune system

10. Helps improve physical balance in people affected by illnesses such as Parkinson's disease

Other concepts

Including:
the effectiveness of music in healthcare and therapeutic settings
music-specific disorders
musicians' physical and mental health and well-being
music performance anxiety (MPA, or stage fright)
motivation, burnout, and depression among musicians
noise-induced hearing loss among musicians
Sleep onset and maintenance insomnia

Journals
Music psychology journals include:
Music Perception
Musicae Scientiae
Psychology of Music
Psychomusicology: Music, Mind, and Brain
Music & Science
 Jahrbuch Musikpsychologie

Music psychologists also publish in a wide range of mainstream musicology, computational musicology, music theory/analysis, psychology, music education, music therapy, music medicine, and systematic musicology journals. The latter include for example:
Acta Acustica United With Acustica
Cognitive Systems Research
Computer Music Journal
Empirical Musicology Review
Frontiers in Neuroscience
Frontiers in Psychology
Journal of the Audio Engineering Society
Journal of New Music Research
Journal of Mathematics and Music
Journal of the Acoustical Society of America
Research Studies in Music Education

Societies

Asia-Pacific Society for the Cognitive Sciences of Music (APSCOM)
Australian Music & Psychology Society (AMPS)
Deutsche Gesellschaft für Musikpsychologie (DGM)
European Society for the Cognitive Sciences of Music (ESCOM)
Japanese Society for Music Perception and Cognition (JSMPC)
Society for Education, Music and Psychology Research (SEMPRE)
Society for Music Perception and Cognition (SMPC)

Centers of research and teaching

Australia: 
Music, Sound and Performance Lab, Macquarie University 
Music, Mind and Wellbeing Initiative, Melbourne University 
Empirical Musicology Group, University of New South Wales 
ARC Centre of Excellence for the History of Emotion, University of Western Australia
The MARCS Institute, University of Western Sydney 
Austria: 
Centre for Systematic Musicology, University of Graz
Cognitive Psychology Unit, University of Klagenfurt
Wiener Klangstil, University of Music and Performing Arts Vienna
Belgium:  
Institute for Psychoacoustics and Electronic Music, Ghent University
Canada: 
Centre for Interdisciplinary Research in Music and Media and Technology, McGill University
Music and Health Research Collaboratory, University of Toronto
Music Cognition Lab, Queen's University
Auditory Perception and Music Cognition Research and Training Laboratory, University of Prince Edward Island
SMART Lab, Toronto Metropolitan University
The Music, Acoustics, Perception, and LEarning (MAPLE) Lab, McMaster University
The Digital Music Lab (DML), McMaster University
McMaster Institute for Music and the Mind, McMaster University
BRAMS - International Laboratory for Brain, Music, and Sound Research, University of Montreal and McGill University
Centre for Research on Brain, Language and Music, University of Montreal
Music and Neuroscience Lab, University of Western Ontario
Denmark: 
Center for Music in the Brain, Aarhus University 
Finland:
Centre of Excellence in Music, Mind, Body and Brain, University of Jyväskylä
France: 
Auditory Cognition and Psychoacoustics team, Claude Bernard University Lyon 1
University of Burgundy
IRCAM, Centre Pompidou
Germany: 
University of Halle-Wittenberg
Institute for Systematic Musicology, Universität Hamburg
Institute of Music Physiology and Musicians' Medicine, Hochschule für Musik, Theater und Medien Hannover
Hanover Music Lab, Hochschule für Musik, Theater und Medien Hannover
University of Cologne
University of Oldenburg
Hochschule für Musik Würzburg
Technische Universität Chemnitz
Iceland:
Centre for Music Research, University of Iceland
Ireland:
University of Limerick
Italy:
Bicocca ERP Lab, University of Milano-Bicocca
Japan:
Kyushu University
Korea: 
Seoul National University
Netherlands: 
Music Cognition Group, University of Amsterdam
Norway:
Centre for Music and Health, Norwegian Academy of Music
Poland: 
Unit of Psychology of Music, Fryderyk Chopin University of Music
Music Performance and Brain Lab, University of Finance and Management in Warsaw
Singapore: 
Music Cognition Group, Social and Cognitive Computing Department, Institute of High Performance Computing, A*STAR
Spain:
Music Technology Group, Pompeu Fabra University
Sweden: 
Speech, Music and Hearing, Royal Institute of Technology
Music Psychology Group, Uppsala University
United Kingdom: 
Centre for Music and Science, Cambridge University
Music and the Human Sciences Group, University of Edinburgh
Centre for Psychological Research, Keele University
Music and Science Lab, Durham University
Interdisciplinary Centre for Scientific Research in Music, University of Leeds
Social and Applied Psychology Group, University of Leicester
Music, Mind and Brain Group, Goldsmiths, University College London
International Music Education Research Centre, UCL Institute of Education, University College London
Music Cognition Lab, Queen Mary University of London
Faculty of Music, University of Oxford
Applied Music Research Centre, University of Roehampton
Centre for Performance Science, Royal College of Music
Centre for Music Performance Research, Royal Northern College of Music
Department of Music, Sheffield University
United States: 
Music and Neuroimaging Laboratory, Beth Israel Deaconess Medical Center and Harvard Medical School
Auditory Perception & Action Lab, University at Buffalo
Janata Lab, University of California, Davis
Systematic Musicology Lab, University of California, Los Angeles
Department of Psychology, University of California, San Diego
UCSB Music Cognition Lab, University of California, Santa Barbara
Music Dynamics Lab, University of Connecticut
The Music Cognition Laboratory, Cornell University
Music Cognition at Eastman School of Music, University of Rochester
Center for Music Research, Florida State University
Music Cognition and Computation Lab, Louisiana State University
Language and Music Cognition Lab, University of Maryland
Auditory Cognition and Development Lab, University of Nevada, Las Vegas
Auditory Neuroscience Laboratory, Northwestern University
Music Theory and Cognition Program, Northwestern University
Music Cognition Lab, Princeton University
Cognitive and Systematic Musicology Laboratory, Ohio State University
Music Learning, Perception, and Cognition Focus Group, University of Oregon
Center for Computer Research in Music and Acoustics, Stanford University
Dowling Laboratory, University of Texas at Dallas
Institute for Music Research, University of Texas at San Antonio
Laboratory for Music Cognition, Culture & Learning, University of Washington
Music, Imaging, and Neural Dynamics (MIND) Laboratory, Wesleyan University
Brain Research and Interdisciplinary Neurosciences Lab, Western Michigan University

See also

 Cognitive musicology
 Cognitive neuroscience of music
 Performance science
 Psychoacoustics
 Psychoanalysis and music
 Music and emotion
 Music-specific disorders
 Music therapy

References

Further reading

Encyclopedia entries
 Palmer, Caroline & Melissa K. Jungers (2003): Music Cognition. In: Lynn Nadel: Encyclopedia of Cognitive Science, Vol. 3, London: Nature Publishing Group, pp. 155–158.
 Deutsch, Diana (2013): Music. In Oxford Bibliographies in Music. Edited by Dunn, D.S. New York: Oxford University Press. 2013, Web Link
 Thompson, William Forde (2014): "Music in the Social and Behavioral Sciences, An Encyclopedia". Sage Publications Inc., New York.

Introductory reading
 Day, Kingsley (October 21, 2004). "Music and the Mind: Turning the Cognition Key". Observer online.
 Jourdain, Robert (1997). Music, the Brain, and Ecstasy: How Music Captures Our Imagination. New York: William Morrow and Company. .
 Honing, Henkjan (2013). "Musical Cognition. A Science of Listening (2nd edition)." New Brunswick, N.J.: Transaction Publishers. .
Levitin, D. J. (2006).  "This Is Your Brain on Music: The Science of a Human Obsession."  New York: Dutton. 
Margulis, Elizabeth Hellmuth. (2018). The Psychology of Music: A Very Short Introduction. New York, NY: Oxford University Press. .
Margulis, Elizabeth Hellmuth. (2013). On Repeat: How Music Plays the Mind. New York, NY: Oxford University Press. . 

Snyder, Bob (2000). "Music and Memory: an introduction" The MIT Press. .
 J.P.E. Harper-Scott and Jim Samson 'An Introduction to Music Studies', Chapter 4: John Rink,The Psychology of Music, (Cambridge University Press, 2009), pp. 60.

Advanced reading
 Deutsch, D. (Ed.) (1982). The Psychology of Music, 1st Edition. New York: Academic Press. .
 Deutsch, D. (Ed.) (1999). The Psychology of Music, 2nd Edition. San Diego: Academic Press. .
 Deutsch, D. (Ed.) (2013). The Psychology of Music, 3rd Edition. San Diego: Academic Press. .
 Dowling, W. Jay and Harwood, Dane L. (1986). Music Cognition. San Diego: Academic Press. .
 Hallam, Cross, & Thaut, (eds.) (2008). The Oxford Handbook of Music Psychology. Oxford: Oxford University Press.
 Krumhansl, Carol L. (2001). Cognitive Foundations of Musical Pitch. Oxford: Oxford University Press. . 
 Patel, Anirrudh D. (2010). Music, language, and the brain. New York: Oxford University Press.
 Parncutt, R. (1989). Harmony: A Psychoacoustical Approach. Berlin: Springer.
Proverbio, A.M. (2019). Neuroscienze Cognitive della Musica: Il cervello musicale tra Arte e Scienza, Zanichelli, Bologna.
 Sloboda, John A. (1985). The Musical Mind: The Cognitive Psychology of Music. Oxford: Oxford University Press. .
 Lerdahl, F. and Jackendoff, R. (21996) A Generative Theory of Tonal Music. The MIT Press. .
 Jackendoff, Ray (1987): Consciousness and the Computational Mind. Cambridge: MIT Press. Chapter 11: Levels of Musical Structure, section 11.1: What is Musical Cognition?
 Temperley, D. (2004). The Cognition of Basic Musical Structures. The MIT Press. .
 Thompson, W. F. (2009). Music, Thought, and Feeling: Understanding the Psychology of Music New York: Oxford University Press. .
 Zbikowski, Lawrence M. (2004). Conceptualizing Music: Cognitive Structure, Theory, and Analysis. Oxford University Press, USA. .
 North, A.C. & Hargreaves, D.J. (2008). The Social and Applied Psychology of Music. Oxford: Oxford University Press. .

External links

 
Musicology